Sukan RTM (formerly known as RTM HD, RTM HD Sports and RTM Sports, stylised as SUKAN rtm) is a Malaysian sports channel provided by RTM. The service was initially run as a trial from 2008, when it started during the Beijing Olympic Games and ended after the Summer Olympics finished. 10 years later, on 13 June 2018, RTM HD was officially launched as a trial broadcast exclusively on MYTV Broadcasting on channel 111. On 13 July 2018, RTM HD changed its name to RTM HD Sports as a free-to-air all-sports channel still in tests. On 1 April 2021, RTM Sports was officially rebranded and launched with the name 'Sukan RTM' during the 75th anniversary of RTM along with 60th anniversary of RTM Orchestra.

Current rights

Current

Football 

 FIFA
 FIFA World Cup
 FIFA Women's World Cup
 UEFA
 UEFA European Championship
 AFF
 AFF Championship
 FAM
 Malaysia national football team 
 Malaysia FA Cup
 MFL 
 Malaysia Super League 
 Piala Sumbangsih
 Malaysia Cup

Rugby union 
 Rugby World Cup

Badminton 
 BWF
 BWF World Tour
 World Championships
 Teams
 Thomas Cup (men's championship)
 Uber Cup (women's championship)
 Sudirman Cup (mixed team championship)
 Individuals
Badminton Asia Championships (national teams (men's, women's, and mixed) and Individuals)

Hockey 
 Sultan of Johor Cup

Mixed martial arts 
 ONE Championship

Cycling 
Tour de Langkawi

Motorsport 
 Asia Road Racing Championship
 Malaysian Cub Prix

Multi-sport events 
 Commonwealth Games
 Summer Olympic Games
 Winter Olympic Games
 Asian Games
 Southeast Asian Games

Former rights

Football

Soccer 
 CONMEBOL
 Copa América (until 2019)
 MFL
 Malaysia Premier League (until 2018)
 Sultan of Selangor's Cup (until 2019)

Basketball 
 ASEAN Basketball League (until 2018–19)

Motorsports 
 MotoGP (until 2021)

See also 
 TV1
 TV2
 TV Okey
 Television in Malaysia
 Radio Televisyen Malaysia

References 

Television channels and stations established in 2018
2018 establishments in Malaysia
Sports television in Malaysia
Television stations in Malaysia
Radio Televisyen Malaysia